John Blyth, Blithe or Blythe  may refer to:

Actors
John Sidney Blyth (1882–1942), birth name of American actor John Barrymore
John Blythe (actor) (1921–1993), English actor

Politicians
John Blithe (MP) (before 1365–1410), English politician
John Blythe (Jamaica) (died 1830s), member of the House of Assembly of Jamaica in 1820; father of John Buddle Blyth
John Blythe (politician) (1842 – after 1890), Canadian politician

Religious figures
John Blithe (priest) (before 1450 – after 1478), English Archdeacon of Stow and Lindsey 1477–78 
John Blyth (bishop) (before 1460–1499), English Bishop of Salisbury 1493–99

Others
John Buddle Blyth (1814–1871), Jamaican-born chemist, first professor of chemistry at Queen's College Cork in Ireland
John Dean Blythe (1842–1869), English writer
John Blythe (footballer) (1924–2007), English centre half

See also
John Drew Barrymore or John Blyth Barrymore, Jr. (1932–2004), American actor, son of John Barrymore 
John Blyth Barrymore III (born 1954), American actor, son of John Drew Barrymore